The 1906 U.S. Open was the twelfth U.S. Open, held June 28–29 at Onwentsia Club in Lake Forest, Illinois, a suburb north of Chicago. Alex Smith won the first of his two U.S. Open titles, seven strokes ahead of runner-up Willie Smith, his younger brother and the 1899 champion.

Willie Anderson, three-time defending champion and club pro at Onwentsia, was the heavy favorite. He trailed Alex Smith by two strokes after the first 36 holes on Thursday, and by three after the third round on Friday morning, but an 84 that afternoon dropped him to a distant fifth. Smith posted rounds of 73-74-73-75 for 295, a U.S. Open record and the first sub-300 winning score. Not only did his brother Willie finish in second, his brother-in-law James Maiden tied for third.

Smith's win marked the end of a streak where Scottish-born players won seven consecutive major championships.

For the first time, no player from the inaugural U.S. Open in 1895 participated. Horace Rawlins, the first champion, had played in every edition until this year.

Past champions in the field 

Source:

Did not play: Harry Vardon (1900), Fred Herd (1898), Joe Lloyd (1897), Horace Rawlins (1895).

Round summaries

First round
Thursday, June 28, 1906 (morning)

Source:

Second round
Thursday, June 28, 1906 (afternoon)

Source:

Third round
Friday, June 29, 1906 (morning)

Source:

Final round
Friday, June 29, 1906 (afternoon)

Source:

Amateurs: Egan (313), Wood (327), Hunter (332), Sellers (337), Potter (342).

References

External links
1906 U.S. Open
USGA Championship Database

U.S. Open (golf)
Golf in Illinois
Lake Forest, Illinois
U.S. Open
U.S. Open (golf)
U.S. Open
June 1906 sports events